Czechs, Slovaks and the Jews, 1938–48: Beyond Idealisation and Condemnation (2013) is a book by the Czech historian Jan Láníček which addresses relations between Czechs, Slovaks, and Jews from the Munich Agreement to the 1948 Czechoslovak coup d'état which installed a Communist government. The book focuses especially on the Czechoslovak government-in-exile and its attitudes and actions with regards to the Jews who had been trapped in Czechoslovakia during the Nazi occupation.

References

2013 non-fiction books
History books about the Holocaust
Palgrave Macmillan books